Events from the year 1793 in the United States.

Incumbents

Federal Government 
 President: George Washington (no political party-Virginia)
 Vice President: John Adams (F-Massachusetts)
 Chief Justice: John Jay (originally from New York)
 Speaker of the House of Representatives: Jonathan Trumbull, Jr. (Pro-Admin.-Connecticut) (until March 4), Frederick Muhlenberg (Anti-Admin.-Pennsylvania) (starting December 2)
 Congress: 2nd (until March 4), 3rd (starting March 4)

Events

January–March
 January 9 – Jean-Pierre Blanchard becomes the first to fly in a gas balloon in the Western Hemisphere, from Walnut Street Jail in Philadelphia to Deptford Township, New Jersey. George Washington, John Adams, Thomas Jefferson, James Madison and James Monroe are among the spectators.
 February – In Manchester, Vermont, the wife of a captain falls ill, probably with tuberculosis. Some locals believe that the cause of her illness is that a demon vampire is sucking her blood. As a cure, Timothy Mead burns the heart of a deceased person in front of a crowd of a few hundred.
 February 12 – The Fugitive Slave Act is passed by Congress as the first of the federal fugitive slave laws under the U.S. Constitution.
 February 25 – George Washington holds the first Cabinet meeting as President of the United States.
 February 27 – The Giles resolutions are introduced to the United States House of Representatives, asking the House to condemn Alexander Hamilton's handling of loans.
 March 1 – John Langdon becomes President Pro Tempore of the United States Senate until March 3.
 March 4 – President George Washington and Vice President John Adams are sworn in for their second term, in Philadelphia.

April–June
 April 9 – Edmond-Charles Genêt, France's new Minister to the United States, arrives at Charleston, South Carolina.  
 April 22 – George Washington signs the Neutrality Proclamation.
 June 21 – The town of Hamilton, Massachusetts, is incorporated.

July–September
 July 9 – The Constitution of Vermont is adopted.
 August 1 – The yellow fever epidemic of 1793 starts in Philadelphia, Pennsylvania.
 September 18 – United States Capitol cornerstone laying: President George Washington lays the cornerstone for the United States Capitol in Washington, D.C.

October–December
 October 12 – The cornerstone of Old East, the oldest state university building in the United States, is laid in Chapel Hill, North Carolina, on the campus of the University of North Carolina (the 12th of October is subsequently celebrated at the University as University Day).
 October 28 – Eli Whitney applies for  patent for his cotton gin (the patent is granted the following March).
 November 9 – George Washington visits Philadelphia to announce end of the yellow fever epidemic in Philadelphia; around 5,000 people have been killed by the fever.
 December 9 – New York City's first daily newspaper, the American Minerva, is established by Noah Webster.

Undated
 Hannah Slater applies to patent a new method of producing sewing thread from cotton.
 The first year of regular production begins for the United States Mint in Philadelphia and the half cent is minted for the first time.
 Lawrence Academy (Groton, Massachusetts) is chartered.
 Slater Mill is completed in Pawtucket, Rhode Island, as the first water-powered cotton spinning mill in North America to utilize the Arkwright system of cotton spinning as developed by Samuel Slater.

Ongoing
 Northwest Indian War (1785–1795)

Births
 January 3 – Lucretia Mott, women's rights activist and abolitionist (died 1880)
 January 4 – Roger Sherman Baldwin, U.S. Senator from Connecticut from 1847 to 1851 (died 1863)
 January 14 – John C. Clark, politician (died 1852)
 February 9 – James Long, Filibuster and founder of the Long Republic - the first "Republic of Texas". (died 1822)
 March 2 – Sam Houston, President of the Republic of Texas (died 1863)
 June 6 – Edward C. Delavan, temperance leader (died 1871)
 July 19 – Thomas Doughty, landscape painter (died 1856)
 August 25 – John Neal, writer, critic, editor, lecturer, and activist (died 1876)
 October 28 – Eliphalet Remington, gunmaker (died 1861)
 November 3 – Stephen F. Austin, empresario (died 1836)
 December 15 – Henry Charles Carey, economist (died 1879)
 Date unknown
 Sandy Cornish, freed slave and farmer (died 1869)
 John Slidell, U.S. Senator from Louisiana from 1853 to 1861 (died 1871 in the United Kingdom)

Deaths
 July 23 – Roger Sherman, lawyer, statesman and signatory of the Declaration of Independence (born 1721)
 October 8 – John Hancock, businessman, smuggler, statesman, patriot and signatory of the Declaration of Independence (born 1737)
 Date unknown – Philip Phile, violinist and composer (born c.1734 in Germany)

See also
Timeline of United States history (1790–1819)

Further reading
 Edward Thornton. The United States through English Spectacles in 1792–1794. The Pennsylvania Magazine of History and Biography, Vol. 9, No. 2 (July 1885).
 Earl L. Bradsher. A Model American Library of 1793. Sewanee Review, Vol. 24, No. 4 (October 1916), pp. 458–475.
 The Democratic Societies of 1793 and 1794 in Kentucky, Pennsylvania and Virginia. The William and Mary Quarterly, Second Series, Vol. 2, No. 4 (October 1922), pp. 239–243.
 F. W. Howay, T. C. Elliott. Voyages of the "Jenny" to Oregon, 1792–94. Oregon Historical Quarterly, Vol. 30, No. 3 (September 1929), pp. 197–206.
 F. W. Howay. The Resolution on the Oregon Coast, 1793–94. Oregon Historical Quarterly, Vol. 34, No. 3 (September 1933), pp. 207–215.
 Lewis Leary. Phaeton in Philadelphia: Jean Pierre Blanchard and the First Balloon Ascension in America, 1793. The Pennsylvania Magazine of History and Biography, Vol. 67, No. 1 (January 1943), pp. 49–60.
 Elsie Murray. French Refugees of 1793 in Pennsylvania. Proceedings of the American Philosophical Society, Vol. 87, No. 5, Papers on Archaeology, Ecology, Ethnology, History, Paleontology, Physics, and Physiology (May 5, 1944), pp. 387–393.
 Philip Marsh. James Monroe as "Agricola" in the Genet Controversy, 1793. The Virginia Magazine of History and Biography, Vol. 62, No. 4 (October 1954), pp. 472–476.
 Wayne's Western Campaign: The Wayne-Knox Correspondence, 1793–1794. The Pennsylvania Magazine of History and Biography, Vol. 78, No. 3 (July 1954), pp. 298–341.
 Lowell H. Harrison. A Virginian Moves to Kentucky, 1793. The William and Mary Quarterly, Third Series, Vol. 15, No. 2 (April 1958), pp. 201–213.
 Dwight L. Smith, Mrs. Frank Roberts. William Wells and the Indian Council of 1793. Indiana Magazine of History, Vol. 56, No. 3 (September 1960), pp. 217–226.
 James R. Beasley. Emerging Republicanism and the Standing Order: The Appropriation Act Controversy in Connecticut, 1793 to 1795. The William and Mary Quarterly, Third Series, Vol. 29, No. 4 (October 1972), pp. 587–610.
 Loren K. Ruff. Joseph Harper and Boston's Board Alley Theatre, 1792–1793. Educational Theatre Journal, Vol. 26, No. 1 (March 1974), pp. 45–52.
 Don R. Gerlach. Black Arson in Albany, New York: November 1793. Journal of Black Studies, Vol. 7, No. 3 (March 1977), pp. 301–312.
 John Hammond Moore. Theophilus Harris's Thoughts on Emigrating to America in 1793. The William and Mary Quarterly, Third Series, Vol. 36, No. 4 (October 1979), pp. 602–614.
 William A. Hunter. John Badollet's "Journal of the Time I Spent in Stony Creeck Glades," 1793–1794. The Pennsylvania Magazine of History and Biography, Vol. 104, No. 2 (April 1980), pp. 162–199.
 Michael L. Kennedy. A French Jacobin Club in Charleston, South Carolina, 1792–1795. The South Carolina Historical Magazine, Vol. 91, No. 1 (January 1990), pp. 4–22.
 David P. Currie. The Constitution in Congress: The Third Congress, 1793–1795. The University of Chicago Law Review, Vol. 63, No. 1 (Winter 1996), pp. 1–48.
 Mark A. Smith. Andrew Brown's "Earnest Endeavor": The "Federal Gazette'"s Role in Philadelphia's Yellow Fever Epidemic of 1793. The Pennsylvania Magazine of History and Biography, Vol. 120, No. 4 (October 1996), pp. 321–342.
 Albrecht Koschnik. The Democratic Societies of Philadelphia and the Limits of the American Public Sphere, c. 1793–1795. William and Mary Quarterly, Third Series, Vol. 58, No. 3 (July 2001), pp. 615–636.
 Tatiana Van Riemsdijk. His Slaves or Hers? Customary Claims, a Planter Marriage, and a Community Verdict in Lancaster County, 1793. The Virginia Magazine of History and Biography, Vol. 113, No. 1 (2005), pp. 46–79.

References

External links
 

 
1790s in the United States
United States
United States
Years of the 18th century in the United States